Bożejewice  is a village in the administrative district of Gmina Strzelno, within Mogilno County, Kuyavian-Pomeranian Voivodeship, in north-central Poland.

History
The village has a history going back thousands of years. Remains have been found of houses from the Linear Pottery culture.

References

Villages in Mogilno County